Goran Žuvela (born 12 October 1948) is a Croatian judoka. He competed in the men's half-heavyweight event at the 1976 Summer Olympics, representing Yugoslavia.

References

External links
 

1948 births
Living people
Croatian male judoka
Olympic judoka of Yugoslavia
Judoka at the 1976 Summer Olympics
People from Vela Luka